Stolen valor is an American term for the behavior of military impostors: individuals who lie about their military service.

Stolen valor may also refer to:

 Stolen Valor, a 1998 book
 Stolen Valor Act of 2005, an act of the United States Congress
 Stolen Valor Act of 2013, an act of the United States Congress